Irimbiliyam  is a census town near valanchery in Malappuram district in the state of Kerala, India. There is lot of small villages Like Mankery, Angadi, MOSCOW, Shapumpadi, and Also palli padi, thirunilam

Demographics
 India census, Irimbiliyam had a population of 27075 with 12898 males and 14177 females.

Transportation
Irimbiliyam village connects to other parts of India through Kuttippuram town.  National highway No.66 passes through Edappal and the northern stretch connects to Goa and Mumbai.  The southern stretch connects to Cochin and Trivandrum.   National Highway No.966 connects to Palakkad and Coimbatore.  The nearest airport is at Kozhikode.  The nearest major railway station is at Kuttippuram and Pallipuram

References

Cities and towns in Malappuram district
Kuttippuram area